WHFR (89.3 MHz) is a low power radio station in Dearborn, Michigan, which is owned and operated by Henry Ford College.  

WHFR programs a variety radio format, music heard little elsewhere on Detroit area radio stations.  The station features alternative/modern rock, big bands, urban gospel, Americana, folk, blues, hip hop, jazz, space rock, urban rock, and world music, in addition to a weekly public affairs show.  Most music shows highlight new releases, independent labels, and local artists. Through a satellite-delivered service known as "Classical 24," the station provides classical music in late nights and early mornings.

WHFR-FM is non-commercial, student-staffed, faculty-guided station with its radio studios in the college's Student Center.  The transmitter is also on the campus, off Evergreen Road.

History
In 1962, WHFR began as a student radio club with only a double-closet-sized room for operating a public address system to the dining room, providing a variety of music and campus announcements during weekday hours. However, the club's mission since its start was to start a real broadcast station, serving the unique music and information needs of the community, as well as the students at HFCC.

By 1978, the HFCC administration, recognizing the spirit and seeing the dedication, applied for an FM broadcast license from the Federal Communications Commission. The license was granted in 1979, but the preparations necessary to broadcast (construction, equipment, staffing, and budget) took until 1985 to get worked out, when the station went on the air.

Beginning with only six hours a day/six days a week, with all shows prerecorded, WHFR grew steadily as it proved itself and attracted more volunteers, first going "live" in 1987 (for three hours a week). In 1988, with a schedule of 12 hours a day, the WHFR staff was stretched thin and moved all of its equipment and music library out of the Student Center and into the new HFCC Fine Arts Center. Since 1997, the station has achieved a 24/7 broadcasting schedule, with the help of over 60 student and alumni volunteers.

Among their achievements and awards by the Michigan Association of Educational Broadcasters and the MAB Michigan Association of Broadcasters, WHFR-FM is also locally recognized as the most diverse station in the state. They've been recognized for this achievement in several newspaper and website polls. 

WHFR's broadcast guide is available every day on their website and features college alternative including indie rock, punk, blues, metal, jazz, classical, opera, choral music, world music, americana/folk, techno, grrl groups and video game soundtracks. Most shows fit a 2-hour time slot, and the format changes for each show.

References 

Michiguide.com - WHFR History

External links

HFR
HFR
Radio stations established in 1962